Hannu Mäkelä (born 23 April 1949) is a Finnish sprinter. He competed in the men's 4 × 400 metres relay at the 1976 Summer Olympics.

References

1949 births
Living people
Athletes (track and field) at the 1976 Summer Olympics
Finnish male sprinters
Olympic athletes of Finland
Place of birth missing (living people)